Pariquera-Açu is a municipality in the state of São Paulo in Brazil. The population is 19,723 (2020 est.) in an area of 359 km². The elevation is 39 m. Nearest cities are Registro and Cananéia.

The municipality contains the  Campina do Encantado State Park, created in 1994.

References

Municipalities in São Paulo (state)